The Copa del Rey 1910 comprised two different competitions held the same year.

Due to disagreements between the reigning champion of the tournament, Club Ciclista de San Sebastián, and some of the clubs invited, in 1910 two parallel competitions were held: an "official", organized by the newly created FEF (Federación Española de Fútbol) later Royal Spanish Football Federation, in Madrid and an "unofficial", organized by the UECF (Unión Española de Clubes de Fútbol), in San Sebastián. Both are currently recognized as official by the RFEF.

Copa UECF (Unión Española de Clubes de Fútbol)

The competition started on 19 March, and concluded on 21 March, with the last group stage match. Athletic Bilbao won the tournament for the third time in its history after beating Vasconia 1–0 in the decisive match with a goal from Remigio Iza. The tournament is believed to have been the first time Athletic Bilbao wore what became their regular red-and-white striped jersey, having recently imported the first set of kit from England (along with a set for their sister club, later known as Atletico Madrid).

Group stage

Copa FEF (Federación Española de Fútbol)

The competition started on 24 May, and concluded on 26 May, with the last group stage match, in which FC Barcelona lifted the trophy for the first time in its history with two victories over Deportivo la Coruña and Español Madrid, beating the latter in a dramatic 3–2 comeback in which Español netted two early goals thanks to Vicente Buylla, but then Barça fought back in the second half and scored via Charles Wallace, Carles Comamala and Pepe Rodríguez.

Group stage

References

External links
LinguaSport.com
RSSSF.com
IFFHS.de

1910
1910 domestic association football cups
1909–10 in Spanish football